Darya Andriyivna Rublova (born 22 February 2000) is a Ukrainian cross-country skier who has competed internationally since 2017. She competed at the 2022 Winter Olympics, in  Women's 4 × 5 kilometre relay, and  Women's 15 kilometre skiathlon.

Career
Rublova started her international career in 2017 when she participated at the 2017 European Youth Olympic Winter Festival in Erzurum, Turkey where her best individual result was 27th in 7.5 km freestyle race. After that she participated at 2020 Nordic Junior World Ski Championships in Oberwiesenthal, Germany (her best individual finish was 62nd in 5 km classical race) and 2021 Nordic U23 World Ski Championships in Vuokatti, Finland (her best individual finish was 51st in 10 km freestyle race).

In 2022, Daria Rublova was nominated for her first Winter Games in Beijing.

Cross-country skiing results
All results are sourced from the International Ski Federation (FIS).

Olympic Games

References

External links

2000 births
Living people
Ukrainian female cross-country skiers
Cross-country skiers at the 2022 Winter Olympics
Olympic cross-country skiers of Ukraine